AQR may refer to:
 Atoka Municipal Airport,  Oklahoma, US
 AQR Capital Management

Aqr may refer to:
 Aquarius (constellation), abbreviation
 Arhâ, ISO 639-3 language code for a New Caledonian language